Juhan Kartau (also Johannes Kartau; 24 August 1883 in Uderna – 24 January 1964 in Jundiaí, Brazil) was an Estonian politician. He was a member of Asutav Kogu.

1919 he was Minister of Education. In 1928, he emigrated to Brazil.

References

1883 births
1964 deaths 
Education ministers of Estonia
Members of the Estonian Constituent Assembly
People from Elva Parish
Estonian emigrants to Brazil
Estonian expatriates in Brazil